Anarawd ap Gruffydd (died 1143) was a Prince of Deheubarth in Southwest Wales.

Lineage 

Anarawd was the eldest son of Gruffydd ap Rhys. On the death of his father in 1137, Anarawd took over the rule of Deheubarth.

Resistance 

In 1136 he and his brother Cadell ap Gruffydd joined with the Prince of Gwynedd, Owain Gwynedd and the latter's brother Cadwaladr ap Gruffydd in an assault on Cardigan Castle which was in Norman hands. The assault was aided by a fleet of Viking ships, but an agreement was reached and the siege lifted.

Dispute with Canterbury 

In 1140 Anarawd again supported Owain Gwynedd, this time in the dispute with the Archbishop of Canterbury about the appointment of a Bishop of Bangor.

Death by treachery 

However, in 1143 Anarawd was treacherously killed by the men of Owain's brother Cadwaladr. Cadwaladr himself was strongly suspected of having ordered the killing. This greatly angered Owain, for Anarawd had been a key ally and was about to marry Owain's daughter. Owain sent his son Hywel ab Owain Gwynedd to strip Cadwaladr of his lands in Ceredigion in punishment.

Succession 

Anarawd was followed on the throne of Deheubarth by his brother Cadell. 

His son, Einion ab Anarawd, was killed by his own servant in 1163, apparently on the orders of Roger de Clare, 3rd Earl of Hertford.

References 
John Edward Lloyd (1911) A history of Wales from the earliest times to the Edwardian conquest (Longmans, Green & Co.) 

1143 deaths
Anarawd
Monarchs of Deheubarth
12th-century Welsh monarchs
Year of birth unknown
Welsh princes